Mir Rustam Jamali (1963–2009) was the Excise and Taxation Minister of Balochistan, assassinated in August 2009.

See also
 Balochistan
 Jamali tribe
 Mir Zafarullah Khan Jamali

External links
 "Kaira condemns killing of provincial minister." Associated Press of Pakistan. August 6, 2009.
 Siddiqui, Tahir. "Balochistan minister shot dead in Karachi." Dawn.com. August 7, 2009.
 Bhatti, M Waqar. "Balochistan minister gunned down in Karachi." The News International. August 7, 2009.

1963 births
2009 deaths
Assassinated activists
Pakistani Muslims
Pakistani politicians
Assassinated Pakistani politicians
Tumandars
Nawabs of Balochistan, Pakistan
Baloch people
People murdered in Karachi
Pakistani Sunni Muslims
People from Jafarabad District
University of Balochistan alumni
Aitchison College alumni
Nawabs of Pakistan
Deaths by firearm in Sindh